36 Lyncis is a solitary variable star located around 620 light years away from the Sun in the northern constellation of Lynx. It has the variable star designation of EI Lyncis, while 36 Lyncis is the Flamsteed designation. This object is visible to the naked eye as a dim, blue-white hued star with an apparent visual magnitude of 5.30. It is moving further away from the Earth with a heliocentric radial velocity of 21 km/s.

This is a magnetic, helium-weak Bp star with a stellar classification of B9IVpHgMn, although the spectral peculiarities have led to alternate classifications such as B8 IIImnp. It is sometimes classified as a mercury-manganese star. It is also an 'sn' star, displaying a spectrum with generally sharp lines for most elements in combination with broad, diffuse lines of helium. 36 Lyncis has been classified as an SX Arietis variable with an amplitude of 0.03 in visual magnitude and a rotationally-modulated period of 3.834 days. The star is spinning with a projected rotational velocity of 49 km/s and a rotation rate of 3.83476 days.

References 

B-type subgiants
Helium-weak stars
Mercury-manganese stars
SX Arietis variables

Lynx (constellation)
BD+43 1893
Lyncis, 36
079158
045290
3652
Lyncis, EI